Charlton George "CG" Lane (11 June 1836, Kennington, London – 2 November 1892, Little Gaddesden, Hertfordshire) was an English amateur cricketer who played first-class cricket from 1854 to 1867.

Lane was a student at Christ Church, Oxford, matriculating in 1855, and graduating B.A. in 1860, M.A. in 1867. A right-handed batsman who was mainly associated with Oxford University and Surrey, he made 46 known appearances in first-class matches.  He played for several predominantly amateur teams including the Gentlemen in the Gentlemen v Players series.

He became a Church of England clergyman and for 22 years to his death in 1892 he was the rector of Little Gaddesden, Hertfordshire. His brother William also played first-class cricket.

References

Further reading
 H S Altham, A History of Cricket, Volume 1 (to 1914), George Allen & Unwin, 1962
 Arthur Haygarth, Scores & Biographies, Volumes 4-11 (1849–1870), Lillywhite, 1862–71

External links
 CricketArchive profile

1836 births
1892 deaths
English cricketers
English cricketers of 1826 to 1863
English cricketers of 1864 to 1889
Gentlemen cricketers
Oxford University cricketers
Surrey cricketers
North v South cricketers
Surrey Club cricketers
Gentlemen of the South cricketers
Gentlemen of England cricketers
People from Kennington
People from Little Gaddesden
Alumni of Christ Church, Oxford
Gentlemen of Marylebone Cricket Club cricketers